George Alan Campbell Pentland (3 October 1883 – 15 December 1952) was an Australian rules footballer who played with South Melbourne in the Victorian Football League (VFL).

Family
The son of William Christie Pentland (1844-1931), and Euphemia Craig Pentland (1848-1924), née Morison, George Alan Campbell Pentland was born on 3 October 1883.

He married Queenie Australia Osborn (1888-1955) on 23 August 1913.

Football
Pentland was a defender who played in the back pocket for South Melbourne in their 1909 VFL Grand Final team which won the club's first ever premiership.

He appeared in all 20 games in 1910 and the following season played finals football for the third successive year.

His last game for South Melbourne came in 1912.

Cricket
He remained on the local sports scene as a cricketer.

He played in 47  matches for the South Melbourne Cricket Club's First XI over 5 seasons (1909/10—1913/14); a batsman, who never bowled, he scored a total of 317 runs for South Melbourne, with an average of 11.74 (his highest score was 53). He toured New Zealand with the South Melbourne Cricket Club in 1912/13.

Death
A retired coachbuilder, he died on 15 December 1952 at his home in Hawthorn, Victoria.

Footnotes

References
 
 VCA 1st XI Career Records 1889-90 to 2017-18; N-R, Cricket Victoria.

External links
 
 

1883 births
Australian rules footballers from Melbourne
Sydney Swans players
Sydney Swans Premiership players
Leopold Football Club (MJFA) players
South Melbourne cricketers
1952 deaths
One-time VFL/AFL Premiership players
People from South Melbourne
Cricketers from Melbourne